Mat Giao Friendship Association is a religious non-profit association in the US, was established in 1987.

Works
Mat Giao (secret Buddhism) Friendship Association (includes groups: Mat Giao Colorado – 917S. Ventura St – Aurora, CO 80017, Mat Giao Virginia – 3628 Annadale rd – Annadale VA 22003, Mat Giao in California) has propagated the Secret Religion under the name of Secret Buddhism in USA, starting from 1987.
This association has published secret Buddhism, religious, mystical books such as Quintessence of Esoteric Buddhism (Author: Trieu Phuoc- Founder of Mat Giao Friendship Association) and The Nomination of the gods and mysticism (Author: Trieu Phuoc). The Association had circulated Tap san Mat giáo (a quarterly magazine) for a period of three years when Mat giao Friendship Association also ceased to operate publicly.

Mat Giao Friendship Association in Virginia had sent its Secret Religion books to Vietnamese's temples and pagoda worldwide and especially, it introduced a special initiation ritual to prove the existence of the Invisible World (i.e. God, Buddhas, Deities, Archangels...) which could be self-performed with magical result at home. So far thousands of people all over the world are reporting their spiritual experiences at www.vutruhuyenbi.com.

In 2007–08 the following universities carries Quintessence of Secret Buddhism and Nominations of the God and Mysticism provided by Mat Giao in California:
George Bush Presidential Library Foundation,
The Library of Congress,
Biola University,
University of Washington,
The University of Utah,
Jackson State University,
The University of Wisconsin,
Iowa Ste University,
The Stanford University Libraries,
Northwestern University,
UCSB Libraries,
Fordham University,
Yale University Library,
Arizona State Library, Archives and Public records,
The University of Alabama,
Robert Manning Strozier Library (The Florida State University),
Dartmouth College,
Cornell University Library,
University of Florida- George A. Smahers Libraries,
Texas A & M University Libraries,
Indiana State University.

Books
 Quintessence of Esoteric Buddhism 
 The nomination of the gods and mysticism

References

External links
 Mat Giao Friendship Association's propagation page

Organizations established in 1987
Buddhist organizations based in the United States